Wick Communications (formerly known as Wick Newspaper Group) is a family-owned media company with 27 newspapers and 18 specialty publications in 11 states. They also publish websites and other specialty publications. The home offices are in Sierra Vista, Arizona, and it has newspapers in Arizona, Louisiana, Montana, Colorado, Alaska, California, North Dakota, South Dakota, Idaho, Oregon and Washington.

History
Milton I. Wick and his brother James Wick founded Wick Communications Company in 1926.

Milton Wick entered the publishing business in 1926 when he became owner and publisher of the Niles Daily Times in Niles, Ohio. Over a period of years, his corporation acquired some 27 newspapers.

In 1926, he married Rose Mary Lumas, and they had two sons, Walter M. Wick and Robert J. Wick, both of whom entered the newspaper business.

In 1926, Milton Wick purchased the Niles Daily Times. His brother, James, was partner in all the newspaper enterprises until his death in 1965 when Milton and sons, Walter and Robert, purchased James' interests.

Milton Wick was born February 20, 1899, in Bowdle, South Dakota and died on November 30, 1981. He was inducted posthumously into the Arizona Newspapers Hall of Fame. In September 2004, Walt and Robert were named to the Arizona Newspaper Hall of Fame.

In January 2018, Wick sold The Daily Herald in Roanoke Rapids, North Carolina, a paper it had owned since 1948, to Paxton Media Group. Wick sold the Half Moon Bay Review, based in Half Moon Bay, California, in May 2018.

In March 2018, Wick Communications bought The Wenatchee World, which was formerly a family-owned newspaper in Washington. Wick Communications also acquired Acadiana LifeStyle in July 2018.

Newspapers

References

External links
 

Companies based in Arizona
Cochise County, Arizona
Newspaper companies of the United States
Publishing companies established in 1984
1984 establishments in Arizona
Family-owned companies of the United States
American companies established in 1984